"Cold" is a song by American band Maroon 5 featuring American rapper Future. The song was released on February 14, 2017, as the second single from their sixth studio album Red Pill Blues (2017), included on both the deluxe and Japanese editions of the album. The song peaked at number 16 on the US Billboard Hot 100 chart.

Recording
"Cold" was written and produced by Phil Shaouy, John Ryan, and Jacob Kasher Hindlin, and was co-written by Adam Levine and Justin Tranter.

Music video
A music video for "Cold" was filmed in Los Angeles in December 2016 and was released on February 15, 2017, on Vevo. It features Levine's wife Behati Prinsloo and was directed by accomplished director Rich Lee. Set in downtown Los Angeles, the video follows with Levine receiving a call for an invite to Future's party, with him reluctant to go, but agrees. He then gets a call from his wife to buy milk on the way home. The track begins when he arrives at the party. When Levine orders a glass of wine, the bartender adds a hallucinogen. He begins to see people as animals, strange figures, and imaginary beings. Levine is then pulled into a threesome with two girls who appear to be horses. He later sees guitarist James Valentine being fellated by a woman in a chicken costume, and a police officer arrives, who morphs into a cartoon stripper. The video shows bizarre cartoon drawings and fuzzy images during Future's verse. Future and Levine are then shown talking to each other, with Levine looking at a hallucination of two old women to his left. Future then appears to turn into a teddy bear, and a female bodybuilder throws Levine into a pool. Levine sees an underwater wedding, before the video circles around to everything he had seen back in time until he finally gets home to put the milk back in the fridge. He then tells his wife everything that happened and goes to bed.

Live performances
Maroon 5 performed "Cold" on television for the first time in The Ellen DeGeneres Show on February 15, 2017. Its first live performance was on the Milwaukee stop of their world tour on February 20. Later, they also performed the song on The Tonight Show Starring Jimmy Fallon on March 14, 2017.

Track listing

Digital download
"Cold" (featuring Future) – 3:54

Digital download – Remix
"Cold" (Remix) (featuring Future & Gucci Mane) – 3:38

Digital download – Sak Noel Remix
"Cold" (Sak Noel Remix) (featuring Future) – 3:45

Digital download – R3hab & Khrebto Remix
"Cold" (R3hab & Khrebto Remix) (featuring Future) – 2:51

Digital download – Kaskade & Lipless Remix
"Cold" (Kaskade & Lipless Remix) (featuring Future) – 3:33

Digital download – Hot Shade & Mike Perry Remix
"Cold" (Hot Shade & Mike Perry Remix) (featuring Future) – 3:44

Digital download – Ashworth Remix
"Cold" (Ashworth Remix) (featuring Future) – 4:02

Digital download – Maesic Remix
"Cold" (Maesic Remix) (featuring Future) – 3:48

Personnel
Credited adapted from Red Pill Blues album credits and album liner.

Maroon 5
 Adam Levine – Lead vocals, songwriting
 Jesse Carmichael – lead guitar, backing vocals
 James Valentine – lead guitar, backing vocals
 Matt Flynn – electronic drums, percussion
 PJ Morton – keyboards, backing vocals
 Sam Farrar – bass guitar, samples 

Additional personnel
 Noah Passovoy – keyboards, additional production 
 Future – guest vocals
 Jacob Kasher Hindlin – production, songwriting
 Phil Shaouy – production, songwriting
 John Ryan – production, songwriting, additional guitars 
 Justin Tranter – songwriting

Charts

Weekly charts

Year-end charts

Certifications

Release history

References

2017 singles
2017 songs
Maroon 5 songs
Future (rapper) songs
Songs written by Adam Levine
Songs written by Jacob Kasher
Songs written by John Ryan (musician)
Songs written by Justin Tranter
Songs about drugs
222 Records singles
Interscope Records singles
Music videos directed by Rich Lee